CODA is a mixed-use development at Tech Square in Midtown Atlanta. The  building contains  of office space,  of "high performance computing space/data center",  of street level retail space, and a  "outdoor living room". There is also a  food hall.

History 
The building was designed by Portman Architects, whose founder John C. Portman Jr. was a Georgia Tech graduate. Portman had been awarded the contract in 2015 to design what was then referred to as the High Performance Computing Center. Construction of the building cost an estimated $375 million, and it was officially declared open on May 23, 2019. As part of the construction, the nearby Crum & Forster Building was partially demolished, with the remaining portion of the building housing a restaurant and special-events space.

The building is notable for housing the world's tallest spiral staircase.

Elevators 

CODA features ThyssenKrupp's TWiN elevator system, the first twin-lift system in North America.

References

External links 

 

Mixed-use developments in Georgia (U.S. state)
Midtown Atlanta
Buildings and structures in Atlanta
Georgia Tech buildings and structures